There are eleven administrative or revenue districts in Delhi, India. Each of these district is headed by a District Magistrate (DM) also called Deputy Commissioner (DC), who reports to the Divisional Commissioner of Delhi. These 11 districts are divided into 33 sub-divisions of Delhi, each headed by a Sub-Divisional Magistrate (SDM).

The district administration of Delhi is the enforcement department for all kinds of the Government of Delhi's policies and exercises supervisory powers over numerous other functionaries of the government.

New Delhi serves as the capital of India and is the seat of all three branches of the government, Executive (Rashtrapati Bhavan), Legislature (Sansad Bhavan) and Judiciary (Supreme Court). Similarly, Delhi is divided into 15 Police Districts, each headed by an IPS officer of the rank of Deputy Commissioner of Police (DCP).

History
 
The present system of administration in Delhi can be traced back to the British India (1858–1947). During the Delhi Durbar of 1911, the capital of India was shifted from Calcutta in the erstwhile Bengal Presidency to New Delhi. Later the status of Delhi was elevated to a Union Territory in November 1956. After the 69th Constitutional (Amendment) Act of 1991 came into force, Delhi was formally renamed as the National Capital Territory of Delhi or NCT of Delhi.

During the 1970s, Delhi had only four administrative districts ie North, South, Central and New Delhi. Between January 1997 and September 2012, there were nine administrative districts and 27 sub-divisions. In September 2012, two new administrative districts, viz. South-East Delhi and Shahdara were added to the city's map.

In 1978, the Delhi Police Act was promulgated, by which Delhi came under the Police Commissionerate system. Since then almost all powers with respect to maintenance of law & order with the Deputy Commissioner were vested in the Commissioner of Delhi Police (as per the Criminal procedure code or CrPC)

The erstwhile Municipal Corporation of Delhi (MCD) came into existence in April 1958 and subsequently, Deputy Commissioners had no role in municipal works. Later in January 2012, MCD was trifurcated into North, South and East MCD. Each of these 3 municipal corporations was headed by an IAS officer of the rank of Municipal Commissioner. In 2022, the 3 municipal corporations were merged again into the newly founded Municipal Corporation of Delhi.

List of Districts of Delhi 
Below is the list of 11 districts and 33 sub-divisions of Delhi (with effect from September 2012). All 11 districts of Delhi fall under Delhi division.

List of Municipalities in Delhi 

There are three Municipalities (1 Municipal Corporation, 1 Municipal Council and 1 Cantonment Board) in Delhi. These are as follows:

See also
Districts of Delhi Police

Notes

References

Delhi
Delhi-related lists